Stefano Belisari (born 30 July 1961 in Milan), nicknamed Elio, is an Italian singer and musician. He is the founding members of the Italian rock band Elio e le Storie Tese.

Career
Elio founded Elio e le Storie Tese in 1980. He is the lead vocalist and occasionally plays the transverse flute (in which he is a graduate at the Milan Conservatory), the electric guitar and the electric bass.

In 2002, Elio graduated from the Politecnico di Milano with a MSc degree in electronic engineering. He had previously interrupted his studies following the success of his music career.

The texts of his songs are humorous and irreverent, and he listed Frank Zappa as a primary influence.

He has been a judge on the panel of the Italian version of The X Factor for five seasons, winning two of them through acts he mentored, Nathalie (season 4, 2010) and Giò Sada (season 9, 2015).

References

External links
Elio e le Storie Tese official website 

1961 births
People of Marchesan descent
Living people
Singers from Milan
Italian male singers
Italian comedy musicians
Polytechnic University of Milan alumni
Engineers from Milan
Musicians from Milan